Michel Duflo (born 15 August 1943) is a French mathematician who works in the representation theory of Lie groups.

Life 
From 1962, Duflo studied at the École normale supérieure and received a doctorate under the supervision of Jacques Dixmier. Currently, he is an emeritus professor at the University of Paris VII (Denis Diderot) at the Institut de Mathématiques de Jussieu, and at the École normale supérieure.

Duflo has worked on the orbit method of Alexander Kirillov. He introduced the Duflo isomorphism, an isomorphism between the center of the enveloping algebra of a finite-dimensional Lie algebra and the invariants of its symmetric algebra.

In 1974 he was an invited speaker at the International Congress of Mathematicians in Vancouver (Inversion formula and invariant differential operators on solvable Lie groups). Duflo received the Prix Le Conte of the French Academy of Sciences; in 1986 he became a corresponding member of the Academy.

His students include Laurent Clozel.

His daughter is the Nobel prize-winning economist Esther Duflo.

References 
The original article was a Google translation of the corresponding German article.

External links

20th-century French mathematicians
21st-century French mathematicians
Members of the French Academy of Sciences
Living people
1943 births
École Normale Supérieure alumni
Academic staff of Paris Diderot University
Academic staff of the École Normale Supérieure